Khristian Ivanov (born 24 January 1977) is a Bulgarian gymnast. He competed at the 2000 Summer Olympics.

References

External links
 

1977 births
Living people
Bulgarian male artistic gymnasts
Olympic gymnasts of Bulgaria
Gymnasts at the 2000 Summer Olympics
Gymnasts from Sofia